Samuel Enander (20 September 1607 – 17 December 1670), later knows as Samuel Nicolai Gyllenadler, was a Swedish prelate who served as the Bishop of Linköping  1655–1670.

Early life
Enander was born  in Västra Eneby, a parish 6 km away from Kisa, Sweden, the son of Nicolaus Petri, a priest, and Elin Jönsdotter Rosendal. Enander commenced studies at Uppsala University in October 1626 and graduated on 13 March 1632. Two years later, he was appointed Associate Professor in Philosophy at the Grammar school in Linköping. Later, in 1637 he studied at Leiden University.

Ordained Ministry
In 1638 Enander was ordained priest and the following year he became vicar of the parish of Rystad. In 1641 he became a lecturer in philosophy and logic and theologian. In 1643 he was appointed vicar of Söderköping and in 1648 he became superintendent within the Swedish army. Later, in 1650, he became Superintendent in the Diocese of Kalmar.

Bishop
In 1655 Enander was appointed Bishop of Linköping and was consecrated on 3 June 1655 by Archbishop Johannes Canuti Lenaeus. He retained his post till his death in 1670.

Personal life
On 10 December 1637 he married Margareta Jönsdotter, daughter of  Jonas Petri Gothus, Bishop of Linköping. He married for the second time in 1663 to Brita Nilsdotter, daughter of Nicolaus Eschilli,  Superintendent of Kalmar. His daughter Elisabeth Gyllenadler (1639–1680) was married to Olov Svebilius (1624–1700) Archbishop of Uppsala.

References

1607 births
1670 deaths
People from Östergötland County
Uppsala University alumni
Leiden University alumni
Bishops of Linköping
Lutheran bishops of Linköping